Mir Babar Ali Anees (1800-1874), also known as Mir Anees was an Indian Urdu poet. He used his pen-name (takhallus) of Anees (Urdu: , Anees means "close friend, companion") in poetry. Anees used Persian, Urdu, Arabic, and Sanskrit words in his poetry. Anis wrote prolonged Marsias, which was a custom of his times, but nowadays only selected sections are narrated even in religious ceremonies. He died in 1291 Hijra, corresponding with 1874 CE.

Family
Mir Babar Ali Anis was born in 1803 CE at Faizabad. In his book Khandaan- e-Mir Anees ke Naamwar Sho’ara (Famous Poets from the family of Mir Anis), Zameer Naqvi lists 22 poets from Mir Anis’ family and their poetry. A researcher in Urdu Literature,  Syed Taqi Abedi, has shown that Mir Anis's family has written poetic literature for three centuries, first in Persian and later in Urdu. Mir Anis was a fifth-generation poet, a fact he mentioned in the first stanza of "Namak-e-Khwaan-e-Takallum hai Fasaahat meri":

Education
Anis's mother appears to have been his greatest  inspiration. He gained a traditional Shia education.  However, research by Nayyar Masood reveals that, while in Faizabad, Anis studied with two religious scholars; one was a Shia Scholar, Mir Najaf and the other was a Hanafi (Sunni) Scholar, Haider Ali Faizabadi. Masood also notes that Anis was well versed in Persian as well as in Arabic. Anis also had military training and gained a thorough knowledge of old and new weapons.

Life
Anis was invited to Lucknow where he reached the zenith of his reputation. He stayed in Lucknow because he believed that his art was not appreciated elsewhere. Yet, after the annexation of Oudh by the British, he was persuaded to visit Azimabad (Patna), Dulhipur (Varanasi), Hyderabad and Allahabad.

In 1870 Nawab Tahwar Jung invited Anis to Hyderabad where he declined to be presented at the court of Mir Mahboob Ali Khan, the then Nizam of Hyderabad State. The Nizam himself went to the Majlis where the poet was to recite.  While returning from Hyderabad, he sojourned at Allahabad in 1871 and recited his marsia in the Imambara of late Lala Beni Prasad Srivastava, Vakil, who was a devotee of Imam Husain.

He died in 1874 CE and is buried at his own residence in Lucknow.

Work and contribution
According to Muhammad Hussain Azad, "The late Mīr Sahib must certainly have composed at least ten thousand elegies, and salāms beyond count. He composed as easily and casually as he spoke.".

In his essay "How to read Iqbal?" Shamsur Rahman Faruqi wrote: "Iqbal was placed better because he had, among others, Bedil (1644–1720) in Persian and Mir Anis (1802–1874) in Urdu." He further asserts: "The mention of Mir Anis may surprise some of us until we realize it that Mir Anis’s Marsiyas are the best premodern model in Urdu of narrative-historical, narrative-lyrical, and oral-dramatic poetry, and Iqbal’s poetry extends and exploits the possibilities created by Anis."

Mir Anis was criticized for playing on religious sentiments giving his work a vertical appeal at the expense of poetic beauty. While Farhat Nadir Rizvi, in her research, has propounded that Anis was narrating recorded history and was therefore restricted in use of pure imagination and fantasy, yet he dexterously harnessed the art of storytelling in his work and we cannot but accept that he was not only a Marsiya writer but also a successful storyteller. Anis has been compared with Shakespeare. Shakespeare creates imaginary plots and characters so beautifully that they appear real to the reader; Anis narrates events and characters fossilized in history so vividly that they become alive in the eyes of his audience.

Anis is also known as a pioneer in Rubai, an Urdu poetry branch, and enjoys status akin to that of Mirza Sauda, Khwaja Mir Dard and Dabeer. 
Besides being a master of the Marsia, Anis was also a specialist of the Rubai, the shortest complete poem in Urdu, containing only four lines. He enriched the contents of the Rubai, making it much more colorful and multi-dimensional. Anis introduced the tragic events of Karbala and their moralistic effect to Rubai. Thus, he widened the scope of Rubai to unfathomable limits. The inclusion of Karbala resulted in the florescence of the Urdu Rubai. Thus, many internal and external aspects of our life found their echo in the Urdu Rubai.

Tribute to poet in Urdu literature

Seminars and symposiums

Dabir Academy in London organised an International Seminar on "Position of Anis and Dabir in Urdu literature" on the occasion of bicentennial birthday celebrations of Mir Anis and Mirza Dabir.

A seminar titled "Mir Anis our Adab-i-Aalia" was jointly held on 19 April 2001 by the Arts Council of Pakistan, Karachi and Pak Arab Literary Society, with Farman Fatehpuri in the chair and Mehdi Masud as the chief guest.  The Arts Council, Karachi, had also organized in April 2002 an evening to commemorate the second birth centenary of Mir Anis.

In August 2003 there was a national seminar on "Mir Anis Ke Marsia Mein Jang ke Anasir" organized by Urdu Department, Hyderabad Central University.

Books on Mir Anis 

 Marsiya Khawani Ka Funn and Marka-i-Anis-au-Dabir (Urdu) by Nayyar Masood 
 Urdu Marsiye K a Safar
 Tajzia-i-Yadgar Marsia, Research and compilation by Taqi Abedi
 Intikhab-e-Kalam Compiled by Muhammad Reza Kazimi
Rubaiyate-e-Anis Compiled By Mr. Mohammad Hasan Bilgrami and Anis Shakhsiyat Aur Fun by Mr. Fazl-e-Imam published by UP Urdu Akademi, India.
 Books by Syed Zameer Akhtar Naqvi  Mir Anees Ki Shairi (in Urdu Language) & The poets in the family of Mir Anis (published in 1996) 2nd Book is about the life history of 22 family members of Mir Anis that were poets and their poetry.
 The immortal poetry & Mir Anis (English) by Syed Ghulam Abbas. Published in 1983 by Majlis-e-Milli, Pakistan in Karachi 
 The battle of Karbala 90 pages (Urdu) Translated by David Matthew Original from the University of California Digitized 27 February 2008 Publisher of 2nd Edition:  Rupa & Co., 1994 
 Mir Anis Aur Qissa Goi Ka Fan 498 pages: By Farhat Nadir Rizvi

See also

 Mirza Dabeer
 Ustad Sibte Jaafar Zaidi
 Mohsin Naqvi
 Marsiya
 Azadari
 Ashura
David Matthews (academic)

References

External links

 Maqbara of Mir Anis
 A website by Abu Talib Rizvi of India
 The Digital South Asia Library- 5th Era of Aab-e-Hayat, Dabeer and Anis (Pritchett translation in English)
 English translation of a marsiya by Anis
 Master pieces of Urdu Rubaiyat by K C Kanda
 A collection of Marsia by Anis
 Marsiya collection of Mir Anis in Urdu.
 
 Mir Babar Ali  "Anis" (1802–1874) jab qa:t kii masaafat-e shab aaftaab ne (his most famous marsiyah) C. M. Naim, The Art of the Urdu Marsiya (1983) – Teaching materials prepared at SOAS during the 1970s: http://www.columbia.edu/itc/mealac/pritchett/00urdu/anis/index.html)

1802 births
1874 deaths
Urdu-language poets from India
Indian male poets
People from Faizabad
Writers from Lucknow
Indian Shia Muslims
Urdu-language religious writers
Urdu-language writers from British India
19th-century Urdu-language writers
Urdu-language writers from Mughal India
19th-century Indian poets
Poets from Delhi
19th-century Indian male writers